Lachnomyrmex is a Neotropical genus of ants in the subfamily Myrmicinae. The genus consists of 16 species restricted to the Neotropics, known from southern Mexico to northern Argentina (and Trinidad just off the coast of Venezuela). They are most often found in the leaf litter of wet forests, with nests located on the ground. Workers forage alone, apparently without recruiting nestmates or using pheromones. Within the tribe Stenammini, they seem to be most closely related to the genera Lordomyrma of Indo-Australia and Cyphoidris of Africa.

Species

 Lachnomyrmex amazonicus Feitosa & Brandão, 2008
 Lachnomyrmex fernandezi Feitosa & Brandão, 2008
 Lachnomyrmex grandis Fernández & Baena, 1997
 Lachnomyrmex haskinsi Smith, 1944
 Lachnomyrmex laticeps Feitosa & Brandão, 2008
 Lachnomyrmex lattkei Feitosa & Brandão, 2008
 Lachnomyrmex longinodus Fernández & Baena, 1997
 Lachnomyrmex longinoi Feitosa & Brandão, 2008
 Lachnomyrmex mackayi Feitosa & Brandão, 2008
 Lachnomyrmex nordestinus Feitosa & Brandão, 2008
 Lachnomyrmex pilosus Weber, 1950
 Lachnomyrmex platynodus Feitosa & Brandão, 2008
 Lachnomyrmex plaumanni Borgmeier, 1957
 Lachnomyrmex regularis Feitosa & Brandão, 2008
 Lachnomyrmex scrobiculatus Wheeler, 1910
 Lachnomyrmex victori Feitosa & Brandão, 2008

References

External links

Myrmicinae
Ant genera
Hymenoptera of North America
Hymenoptera of South America